Chautauqua County is the westernmost county in the U.S. state of New York. As of the 2020 census, the population was 127,657. Its county seat is Mayville, and its largest city is Jamestown. Its name is believed to be the lone surviving remnant of the Erie language, a tongue lost in the 17th century Beaver Wars; its meaning is unknown and a subject of speculation. The county was created in 1808 and organized in 1811.

Chautauqua County comprises the Jamestown–Dunkirk–Fredonia, NY Micropolitan Statistical Area. It is located south of Lake Erie and includes a small portion of the Cattaraugus Reservation of the Seneca.

History
Prior to European colonization, most of what is now Chautauqua County was inhabited by the indigenous Erie people prior to the Beaver Wars in the 1650s. French forces traversed the territory beginning in 1615. The Seneca Nation conquered the territory during the Beaver Wars and held it through the next century until siding with the British crown, their allies for most of the 18th century, against the American revolutionaries in the American Revolutionary War.

Chautauqua County was organized by the state legislature during the development of western New York after the American Revolutionary War and the ratification of The Treaty of Canandaigua, between the United States and the Council of the Six Nations. It was officially separated from Genesee County on March 11, 1808. This partition was performed under the same terms that produced Cattaraugus and Niagara counties. The partition was done for political purposes, but the counties were not properly organized for self-government, so they were all administered as part of Niagara County.

On February 9, 1811, Chautauqua was completely organized, and its separate government was launched. This established Chautauqua as a county of 1,100 square miles (2,850 square km) of land. Chautauqua has not been altered since.

The first New York Chautauqua Assembly, was organized in 1874 by Methodist minister John Heyl Vincent and businessman Lewis Miller in the county at a campsite on the shores of Chautauqua Lake.

Geography

Chautauqua County, in the southwestern corner of New York State, along the New York-Pennsylvania border, is the westernmost of New York's counties. Chautauqua Lake is located in the center of the county, and Lake Erie is its northern border.

Part of the Eastern Continental Divide runs through Chautauqua County. The area that drains into the Conewango Creek (including Chautauqua Lake) eventually empties into the Gulf of Mexico; the rest of the county's watershed empties into Lake Erie and via Lake Ontario and the St. Lawrence Seaway into the North Atlantic Ocean. This divide, known as the Chautauqua Ridge, can be used to mark the border between the Southern Tier and the Niagara Frontier. It is also a significant dividing point in the county's geopolitics, with the "North County" being centered on Dunkirk and the "South County" centered on Jamestown each having their own interests.

The county is generally composed of rolling hills and valleys, with elevations ranging anywhere between 1100 and 2100 feet, although the land within a few miles of Lake Erie is generally flat and at an elevation of 1000 feet or lower.

Adjacent counties
 Erie County - northeast
 Cattaraugus County - east
 Warren County, Pennsylvania - southeast
 Erie County, Pennsylvania - southwest

Major highways

Demographics

2020 Census

2000 Census 
As of the 2000 Census, there were 139,750 people, 54,515 households, and 35,979 families in the county. The population density was 132 people per square mile (51/km2). There were 64,900 housing units at an average density of 61 per square mile (24/km2). The racial makeup of the county was 94.04% White, 2.18% Black or African American, 0.43% Native American, 0.36% Asian, 0.03% Pacific Islander, 1.73% from other races, and 1.23% from two or more races. 4.22% of the population were Hispanic or Latino of any race. In terms of ancestry, 17.3% were German, 15.1% were Italian, 11.6% were Swedish, 10.9% were English, 9.3% were Polish, 9.2% were Irish and 5.6% were of American ancestry according to Census 2000. 93.0% spoke English and 3.8% Spanish as their first language.

Of the 54,515 households 30.50% had children under the age of 18 living with them, 50.90% were married couples living together, 10.80% had a female householder with no husband present, and 34.00% were non-families. 28.10% of households were one person and 12.60% were one person aged 65 or older. The average household size was 2.45 and the average family size was 2.99.

The age distribution was 24.50% under the age of 18, 10.30% from 18 to 24, 26.30% from 25 to 44, 23.00% from 45 to 64, and 16.00% 65 or older. The median age was 38 years. For every 100 females there were 95.20 males. For every 100 females age 18 and over, there were 92.20 males.

The median household income was $33,458 and the median family income was $41,054. Males had a median income of $32,114 versus $22,214 for females. The per capita income for the county was $16,840. About 9.70% of families and 13.80% of the population were below the poverty line, including 19.30% of those under age 18 and 8.20% of those age 65 or over.

As of the 2010 Census, there were 134,905 people in the county. The population density was 127 people per square mile (49/km2). The racial makeup of the county was 92.57% (124,875 people) white, 2.37% (3,197 people) African-American, 0.51% (688 people) Asian, 0.51% (689 people) Native American/Alaskan, 0.03% (34 people) Native Hawaiian/Pacific Islander, 1.98% (2,669 people) other, and 2.04% (2,751 people) two or more races. The Hispanic/Latino population of any race was 6.11% (8,241 people). In terms of ancestry, 25% were German, 16% were Italian, 12.8% were Swedish, 16% were English, 10.6% were Polish, 14.9% were Irish and 3.2% were of American ancestry according to the 2010 Census. 92.9% spoke English and 4.1% Spanish as their first language.

The age distribution was 21.83% of the population under the age of 18, 3.82% (5,155 people) ages 18 and 19, 7.50% (10,113 people) ages 20–24, 10.37% (13,985 people) ages 25–34, 18.83% (25,406 people) ages 35–49, 21.07% (28,419 people) ages 50–64, and 16.59% (22,381 people) over the age of 65. Of the population, 49.3% (66,509 people) were male and 50.7% (68,396 people) were female.

Government and politics
All of the county is in the 150th New York State Assembly district, represented by Andy Goodell, and the New York State Senate 57th district (served by George Borrello). The entire county is within the bounds of New York's 23rd congressional district (served by Tom Reed until his resignation for inappropriate conduct). Prior to 2013, the county was part of New York's 27th congressional district. Prior to 2003, the county was part of New York's 31st congressional district (now the 29th), but was controversially redistricted out of that district and into what was the 27th, and was replaced in the 29th district by Rochester suburbs that had never before been part of the district. Chautauqua County, at the same time, joined southern Erie County and portions of the City of Buffalo in the 27th, areas that had also never been in the same district with each other. In both cases, the suburban additions were significantly more Democratic populations than the rural 31st was, leading to Democrats winning both portions of the divided territory and accusations of cracking-based gerrymandering. The 2012 redistricting process moved all of Chautauqua County into Goodell's assembly district, while the county also rejoined the former 31st (renumbered the 23rd) congressional district along with Cattaraugus and Allegany Counties.

There are an even number of registered Democrats and Republicans in Chautauqua County.

|}

Chautauqua County is one of nineteen “charter counties” in New York, which grants the county greater leeway in conducting its own affairs.

Chautauqua County was governed by a board of supervisors until 1975, when a new county charter went into effect with provisions for a county executive and a 13-seat county legislature. The county council currently consists of 19 members, down from 25, each elected from single member districts. PJ Wendel is the current chairman.

Though the Republican Party has historically been dominant in Chautauqua County politics, the county had been a perfect bellwether county from 1980 to 2008, correctly voting for the winner of each presidential election in all eight elections in that time frame. Its 2012 vote (in which it voted for Republican Mitt Romney instead of incumbent Democrat Barack Obama) was its first miss since 1976. In 2016, Donald Trump won the county by the largest margin since Ronald Reagan in 1984.

Education
Jamestown Community College has two campuses in the county at Jamestown and Dunkirk. The State University of New York at Fredonia is located in the northern part of the county. Jamestown Business College offers two year degrees, certificates, and a four-year degree in Jamestown.

Communities

† - County Seat

†† - Former Village

Towns

 Arkwright
 Busti
 Carroll
 Charlotte
 Chautauqua
 Cherry Creek
 Clymer
 Dunkirk
 Ellery
 Ellicott
 Ellington
 French Creek
 Gerry
 Hanover
 Harmony
 Kiantone
 Mina
 North Harmony
 Poland
 Pomfret
 Portland
 Ripley
 Sheridan
 Sherman
 Stockton
 Villenova
 Westfield

Other hamlets

 Ashville
 Findley Lake
 Hamlet
 Irving
 Laona
 Lily Dale
 Maple Springs
 Van Buren Bay

Indian reservation 
 Cattaraugus Reservation

Unorganized territory
 Chautauqua Lake

In literature
Joyce Carol Oates' 1996 novel, We Were the Mulvaneys is set in rural Chautauqua County, near the fictional town of Mt. Ephraim.

See also

 List of counties in New York
 National Register of Historic Places listings in Chautauqua County, New York
 Chautauqua County, Kansas

Notes

Citations

Further reading

External links
 Chautauqua County Government Website
 Census information
 Chautauqua County, New York History pages

 
1811 establishments in New York (state)
Populated places established in 1811
Counties of Appalachia
New York placenames of Native American origin